The Diocese of Saltillo is a Latin Church ecclesiastical territory or diocese of the Catholic Church in Mexico. The diocese was erected on 23 June 1891. It is a suffragan in the ecclesiastical province of the metropolitan Archdiocese of Monterrey.

History
The Franciscan Father Andres de Leon was one of the first missionaries in this territory in the sixteenth century. In 1827 the name of Saltillo was changed to Ciudad Leona Vicario, in honor of the Mexican heroine of that name, but the original name always prevailed. The Franciscan Fathers of the Province of Jalisco had eight missions in Coahuila, which, in 1777, formed part of the See of Linares, or Monterey, and belonged to it until 1891, when Pope Leo XIII erected the See of Saltillo with jurisdiction over the entire State of Coahuila.

According to the Catholic News Agency (CNA), Bishop Raul Vera Lopez of Saltillo, Mexico will meet with Cardinal Marc Ouellet, the Cardinal Prefect of the Congregation for Bishops in the Vatican's Roman Curia, "to discuss Bishop Vera's support for the San Elredo Community, an organization that embraces homosexuality." The San Elredo Community has become a separate organization apart from the Diocese of Saltillo.

Bishops

Ordinaries
Santiago de los Santos Garza Zambrano (1893–1898), appointed Bishop of León, Guanajuato
José María de Jesús Portugal y Serratos, O.F.M. (1898–1902), appointed Bishop of Aguascalientes
Jesús María Echavarría y Aguirre (1904–1954)
Luis Guízar y Barragán (1954–1975)
Francisco Raúl Villalobos Padilla (1975–1999)
José Raúl Vera López, O.P. (1999–2020) - Bishop Emeritus
Hilario González García (2020–present)

Coadjutor bishop
Luis Guízar y Barragán (1938–1954)

Auxiliary bishops
Manuel Samaniego Barriga (1969–1971), appointed Bishop of Ciudad Altamirano, Guerrero
Francisco Raúl Villalobos Padilla (1971–1975), appointed Bishop here

Territorial losses

Episcopal See
Saltillo, Coahuila

External links and references

Saltillo
Saltillo, Roman Catholic Diocese of
Saltillo
Saltillo
1891 establishments in Mexico
Saltillo